Glen Buttriss (born 20 August 1985) is an Australian former professional rugby league footballer who played in the 2000s and 2010s for the Canberra Raiders in the National Rugby League.

Buttriss is from a small town, Cootamundra, in southwest New South Wales.

Playing career
Buttriss made his debut for Canberra against Melbourne in Round 6 2008.  Buttriss went on to make a total of 119 appearances for Canberra between 2008 and 2015.

On 16 February 2017, Buttriss was announced as captain for The Mount Pritchard Mounties in The NSW Intrust Super Premiership.  

On 2 October 2017, it was announced that Buttriss had returned home to Cootamundra to play for the Cootamundra Bulldogs in the local competition.

Post playing
Buttriss currently works at the Melba Copland Secondary School and College as a youth worker.

References

External links

NRL profile 
Canberra Raiders profile
Souths Logan Magpies

1985 births
Living people
Australian rugby league players
Canberra Raiders players
Mount Pritchard Mounties players
People from Cootamundra
Rugby league hookers
Rugby league players from New South Wales